Cielo is a compilation album released by Benny Ibarra in 2003.

Track listing 
"Cielo 2002" 
"Tonto Corazón" 
"Sin Ti" 
"Todo o Nada" 
"Inspiración" 
"Irremediable" 
"Uno" 
"Mia"
"Sutil Dolor" 
"Estoy (Live)"

2003 albums
Benny Ibarra albums